Anapis is a genus of araneomorph spiders in the family Anapidae, first described by Eugène Simon in 1895.

Species
 it contains twenty-nine species:
Anapis amazonas Platnick & Shadab, 1978 – Colombia
Anapis anabelleae Dupérré & Tapia, 2018 – Ecuador
Anapis anchicaya Platnick & Shadab, 1978 – Colombia
Anapis atuncela Platnick & Shadab, 1978 – Colombia
Anapis calima Platnick & Shadab, 1978 – Colombia
Anapis caluga Platnick & Shadab, 1978 – Peru
Anapis carmencita Dupérré & Tapia, 2018 – Ecuador
Anapis castilla Platnick & Shadab, 1978 – Peru, Brazil
Anapis chiriboga Platnick & Shadab, 1978 – Ecuador
Anapis choroni Platnick & Shadab, 1978 – Venezuela
Anapis churu Dupérré & Tapia, 2018 – Ecuador
Anapis circinata (Simon, 1895) – Venezuela
Anapis digua Platnick & Shadab, 1978 – Colombia
Anapis discoidalis (Balogh & Loksa, 1968) – Brazil
Anapis felidia Platnick & Shadab, 1978 – Colombia
Anapis guasca Platnick & Shadab, 1978 – Colombia
Anapis heredia Platnick & Shadab, 1978 – Costa Rica
Anapis hetschki (Keyserling, 1886) – Brazil
Anapis keyserlingi Gertsch, 1941 – Panama
Anapis mariebertheae Dupérré & Tapia, 2018 – Ecuador
Anapis meta Platnick & Shadab, 1978 – Colombia
Anapis mexicana Forster, 1958 – Mexico, Belize
Anapis minutissima (Simon, 1903) – Jamaica
Anapis monteverde Platnick & Shadab, 1978 – Costa Rica
Anapis naranja Dupérré & Tapia, 2018 – Ecuador
Anapis nawchi Dupérré & Tapia, 2018 – Ecuador
Anapis nevada Müller, 1987 – Colombia
Anapis saladito Platnick & Shadab, 1978 – Colombia
Anapis shina Dupérré & Tapia, 2018 – Ecuador

References

Anapidae
Araneomorphae genera
Spiders of Central America
Spiders of South America
Taxa named by Eugène Simon